WNUV (channel 54) is a television station in Baltimore, Maryland, United States, affiliated with The CW. It is owned by Cunningham Broadcasting, which maintains a local marketing agreement (LMA) with Sinclair Broadcast Group, owner of Fox/MyNetworkTV affiliate WBFF (channel 45), for the provision of certain services. However, Sinclair effectively owns WNUV as the majority of Cunningham's stock is owned by the family of deceased group founder Julian Smith. Sinclair also operates TBD affiliate WUTB (channel 24) under a separate shared services agreement (SSA) with Deerfield Media.

The stations share studios on 41st Street off the Jones Falls Expressway on "Television Hill" in the Woodberry neighborhood of north Baltimore.

History
WNUV began broadcasting on July 1, 1982, originally owned by a local firm called NuVision, Inc. The station was Baltimore's third UHF commercial outlet, but only the second on the air at the time (alongside eventual sister station WBFF). Channel 54 was originally programmed as a hybrid of weekday business news from the Financial News Network (now part of CNBC) and the subscription television service SuperTV. FNN programming ran during the daytime hours, while subscription television programs from SuperTV aired during the evening and late night hours, as well as on Sunday afternoons.

In the fall of 1984, WNUV dropped weekday FNN programming and slowly began to add general entertainment programs, such as cartoons, off-network reruns and movies (which the station had already been running on weekends), while retaining Super TV programming at night and on Sunday afternoons. In the spring of 1986, the station dropped the SuperTV service and became a full-time conventional independent station, adopting the on-air brand name "Baltimore 54". At that time, channel 54 ran morning and afternoon children's programming similar to WBFF's Captain Chesapeake, hosted from a mock space ship by a Star Trek-like crew of characters known as the "54 Space Corps". Also, during the late-1980s, the station IDs included a "Pet of the Day", each of which was offered by a local viewer.  WNUV quickly established itself as a solid competitor to WBFF. In 1986, the station picked up The Tonight Show Starring Johnny Carson, an NBC program not cleared by WMAR-TV; the program had previously aired on WBFF, which dropped Carson to make room for The Late Show Starring Joan Rivers.

In March 1989, WNUV was bought by Abry Communications. Under its ownership, the station remained a full-time independent one and, in 1994, picked up the broadcast rights to some Baltimore Orioles games produced by Home Team Sports. The station showed Orioles games through 2006. From 1993 to 1994, the station aired Late Show with David Letterman in lieu of WBAL-TV, which declined to carry the show.

Around 1994, Abry merged with Sinclair Broadcast Group. However, Sinclair already owned WBFF and could not keep both stations. Accordingly, WNUV was purchased by Glencairn Ltd., headed by former Sinclair executive Edwin Edwards. The Smith family, owners and founders of Sinclair (which launched WBFF in 1971) owned 97% of Glencairn's stock, so Sinclair effectively owned both stations. Sinclair further circumvented the rules by signing a local marketing agreement with Glencairn,  under which WNUV's operations were merged with those of WBFF. In effect, Sinclair had emasculated WBFF's major rival. WNUV was Glencairn's first station, and similar deals resulted in Glencairn owning eleven stations all operated by Sinclair under LMAs. The Federal Communications Commission eventually fined Sinclair $40,000 in 2001 for illegally controlling Glencairn.  WNUV was an affiliate of the Prime Time Entertainment Network programming service from 1993 until 1995.

WNUV became the original Baltimore affiliate of the United Paramount Network (UPN), when the network launched on January 16, 1995. However, in January 1998—through an affiliation deal that resulted in Sinclair's five UPN affiliates switching to the network—channel 54 became the market's WB affiliate, replacing low-power station WMJF-LP. The UPN affiliation moved to Home Shopping Network station WHSW (channel 24), which had been purchased by UPN part-owner Chris-Craft Industries and changed its callsign to WUTB.

Sinclair tried to purchase WNUV outright in 2001 as part of a merger with Glencairn. However, the FCC turned down the request because Baltimore was one of six markets where Sinclair could not legally have a duopoly. The Baltimore market, despite its relatively large size (it is the 24th-largest market) has only eight full-power stations (or seven, if the two Maryland Public Television stations licensed in the market are treated as one)—too few to legally permit a duopoly (the FCC requires a market to have eight unique station owners once a duopoly is formed—effectively limiting duopolies to markets with at least nine full-power stations). As a result, WNUV was one of five stations retained by Glencairn, which was renamed Cunningham Broadcasting. However, Cunningham (and WNUV) is still effectively owned by Sinclair since most of its stock is held by trusts owned by the Smith family. There is nearly uncontestable evidence that Glencairn/Cunningham has served as a corporate shell used by Sinclair to circumvent FCC ownership rules.

On January 24, 2006, Time Warner and CBS Corporation announced that they would shut down The WB and UPN and merge some of their programming on a new network called The CW. One month later, Fox, which had bought WUTB in 2001, announced the formation of MyNetworkTV, with WUTB and the other Fox-owned UPN affiliates as the nuclei. Conventional wisdom suggested that WNUV would become Baltimore's CW affiliate. However, when The CW released the initial list of affiliates outside its core group of stations owned by Tribune Broadcasting and CBS Television Stations, WNUV was not included on the list. Sinclair later announced that it would affiliate most of its WB and UPN affiliates with MyNetworkTV a month after that network announced its formation, leading to speculation that WNUV would revert to being an independent station. It was not until May 2, 2006, that Sinclair entered into a deal to affiliate the company's UPN and WB affiliates that did not sign with MyNetworkTV, including WNUV, with The CW. The station's branding switched in September to "The CW Baltimore". The CW Television Network commenced operations on September 18, 2006.

Subchannel history
Sinclair launched a second subchannel carrying TheCoolTV in 2010 but dropped it by September 1, 2012. After going dark for almost two years, WNUV's second subchannel returned with getTV in 2014. Then in late 2015, it was flipped to Antenna TV.

The station launched a third subchannel carrying Comet upon its launch on October 31, 2015.

Newscasts
WNUV launched a 6:30 p.m. newscast in March 1997 called UPN 54 News at 6:30 (changed to WB 54 News at 6:30 in January 1998). The newscast shared the same news set and anchors as WBFF's 10 p.m. newscast.   In January 2005, Sinclair decided to move WNUV's 6:30 p.m. newscast over to WBFF airing at 5:30 p.m. weeknights. The station currently airs no live newscasts, however they began relaying Sinclair's national news program The National Desk in January 2021.

Technical information

Subchannels
The station's digital signal is multiplexed:

Analog-to-digital-conversion
WNUV shut down its analog signal, over UHF channel 54, on February 17, 2009, the original target date in which full-power television stations in the United States were to transition from analog to digital broadcasts under federal mandate (which was later pushed back to June 12). The station's digital signal remained on its pre-transition UHF channel 40, using PSIP to display the station's virtual channel as its former UHF analog channel 54.

As a part of the repacking process following the 2016-2017 FCC incentive auction, WNUV was reassigned to UHF channel 25 and was to relocate by 2020, using PSIP to display its virtual channel number as 54. Because it did not have to wait for any other stations to move first, WNUV moved to channel 25 on September 1, 2018 to allow new spectrum licensee T-Mobile to begin operations.

Testing new technologies
Sinclair has twice used WNUV as a testing ground for new television technologies.

In July 2009, Washington, D.C. area TV stations became a test market for Mobile DTV, and WNUV was one of the participating stations.

In 2013, WNUV received FCC authorization to begin conducting tests of the OFDM-based DVB-T2 terrestrial television standard and other future television broadcast standards, with the aim of identifying the feasibility of next-generation standards for mobile device usage and 4K ultra-HD;  the experimental broadcasts began on the morning of March 27, 2013. The tests run between 1 a.m. and 5 a.m. and do not interrupt cable reception; the lost programs are aired on a digital subchannel of WBFF.

ATSC 3.0 lighthouse
WNUV's RF 25 signal became the Baltimore market's ATSC 3.0 lighthouse station on June 24, 2021. As required by FCC rules, WNUV's existing ATSC 1.0 channels relocated to other stations in the market to preserve service to existing ATSC 1.0 receivers.

References

External links

1982 establishments in Maryland
The CW affiliates
Antenna TV affiliates
Stadium (sports network) affiliates
Comet (TV network) affiliates
Sinclair Broadcast Group
Television channels and stations established in 1982
NUV
Woodberry, Baltimore
ATSC 3.0 television stations